Treriksrøysa (Three-Country Cairn) is a cairn which marks the tripoint where the borders between Norway, Finland and Russia meet. It is the only place in Europe where three time zones meet: Central European Time, Eastern European Time and Further-eastern European Time. The tripoint can only be approached by the public from the Norwegian side, since both Finland and Russia maintain extensive border zones where public access is prohibited.

See also
 Three-Country Cairn - three-country cairn marking the border point between Finland, Norway and Sweden.
 Finnish–Russian border
 Finland–Norway border
Øvre Pasvik National Park

References

Finland–Norway border
Norway–Russia border
Border tripoints
Finland–Russia border